Diocese of Christchurch may refer to:

Anglican Diocese of Christchurch, a geographical area of the Anglican Church, in New Zealand
Roman Catholic Diocese of Christchurch, a geographical area of the Roman Catholic Church, in New Zealand